The 1995 Baltimore mayoral election saw the reelection of incumbent mayor Kurt Schmoke to a third term.

, this was the last time the Republican candidate managed even 20% of the city’s vote.

Nominations
Primary elections were held September 12.

Democratic primary

Republican primary

General election
The general election was held November 7.

References

Baltimore mayoral
Mayoral elections in Baltimore
Baltimore